Hard Way Tour 1991 is the second live album released by the Japanese hard rock band Show-Ya. It is the last record issued with the original lead singer Keiko Terada. The show was videotaped and release in VHS and LaserDisc in 1991, with a different track listing than the album. The album reached position No. 22 in the Japanese Oricon chart.

Track listings

Live album
"Metallic Woman" – 6:42
"Life Is Dancing" – 5:24
"Watashi Wa Arashi" (私は嵐) – 4:14
"Blue Rose Blues" – 5:38
"Naze" (何故) – 5:05
"Keyboard Solo / Battle Express" – 7:47
"Make It Up – Dounikashite Yo –" (Make It Up ―どうにかしてよ―) – 7:26
"Look at Me!" – 4:19
"Fairy" – 4:11
"Gambling" (ギャンブリング) – 3:24
"Genkai Lovers" (限界 Lovers) – 4:47

DVD track listing
"Metallic Woman"
"Life Is Dancing"
"Watashi Wa Arashi" (私は嵐)
"Blue Rose Blues"
"Renegade"
"Look at Me!"
"Fairy"
"Gambling" (ギャンブリング)
"Sono Ato De Koroshitai" (その後で殺したい)
"Genkai Lovers" (限界 Lovers)

Personnel

Band members
Keiko Terada – vocals
Miki Igarashi – guitars
Miki Nakamura – keyboards
Satomi Senba – bass
Miki Tsunoda – drums

Production
Atsuhiro Sakamoto – producer, engineer
Yasuyuki Moriyama – producer

References

External links
Show-Ya discography 

Show-Ya albums
1991 live albums
EMI Records live albums
1991 video albums
Live video albums
Japanese-language live albums
Japanese-language video albums